Cyclin E2 is a protein that in humans is encoded by the CCNE2 gene. It is a G1 cyclin that binds Cdk2 and is inhibited by p27(Kip1) and p21(Cip1). It plays a role in the G1/S portion of the cell cycle and also has putative interactions with proteins CDKN1A, CDKN1B, and CDK3. Aberrant expression can lead to cancer.

References 

 

Proteins